Louis André (28 March 1838, Nuits-Saint-Georges, Côte-d'Or – 18 March 1913) was France's Minister of War from 1900 until 1904. Loyal to the secularist Third Republic, he was anti-Catholic, militantly anticlerical, a Freemason and was implicated in the Affaire Des Fiches, a scandal in which he received reports from Masonic groups on which army officers were practicing Catholics for the purpose of denying their promotions.

Affair des Fiches
According to Piers Paul Read, "The information, as it came in, was entered on cards or fiches. These would be marked either Corinth or Carthage -- the Corinthians being the sheep who should be promoted and the Carthaginians, the goats who should be held back. An officer reported to be 'perfect in all respects; excellent opinions,' would be marked as a Corinthian: another who, 'though a good officer, well reported on, takes no part in politics,' would nonetheless be designated a Carthaginian because he, 'went to Mass with his family,' and sent his six children to Catholic schools.  A bachelor officer who went to Mass was by definition of a reactionary disposition. Officers loyal to the republican ideals were encouraged to report the opinions voiced by their colleagues in the mess."

In 1904, Jean Bidegain, the assistant Secretary of Grand Orient de France, secretly sold a selection of the Fiches to Gabriel Syveton of the Ligue de la Patrie Francaise for 40,000 francs. The resulting scandal led directly to the resignation of French Prime Minister Emile Combes.

See also
 Anticlericalism and Freemasonry

Notes

References

1838 births
1913 deaths
People from Côte-d'Or
Catholicism and Freemasonry
Politics of France
Secularism in France
French Freemasons
French Ministers of War